Mihail Tcaciuk (Mykhaylo Anatoliyovych Tkachuk; born 17 December 1971) is a former Moldovan and Ukrainian football player.

References

1971 births
Living people
Soviet footballers
Moldovan footballers
CS Tiligul-Tiras Tiraspol players
FC Nistru Cioburciu players
FC KAMAZ Naberezhnye Chelny players
Moldovan expatriate footballers
Expatriate footballers in Russia
Russian Premier League players
CSF Bălți players
FC Dnister Ovidiopol players
Association football forwards
FC Nosta Novotroitsk players